Events from the year 1988 in Kuwait.

Incumbents
Emir: Jaber Al-Ahmad Al-Jaber Al-Sabah
Prime Minister: Saad Al-Salim Al-Sabah

Events

Births

 21 April - Amer Al Fadhel.
 18 June - Abdullah Al Shemali.
 1 September - Fahad Al Enezi.
 19 October - Aziz Mashaan.

References

 
Kuwait
Kuwait
Years of the 20th century in Kuwait
1980s in Kuwait